The Moonlite Theatre, also known as the Moonlite Drive-In, is a historic drive-in theater located near Abingdon, Washington County, Virginia. It was built in 1949. Remaining original buildings and structures include the 65-foot-tall screen tower and office wing, the ticket booth, the concession stand/projector booth building, and the neon-illuminated attraction board at the edge of the highway.  The theatre includes 454 parking/viewing spaces designed as reverse-incline ramps.

Background
It was listed on the National Register of Historic Places in 2007, and was one of few drive-in theaters nationwide to be awarded that distinction.

The Moonlite closed in 2013 and was in danger of being lost due to neglect. Some renovation work was begun in late 2016 under an agreement  establishing joint ownership of the theater and through monetary and labor contributions from private individuals. Although these were not yet complete, it re-opened and began showing its traditional week-end double features in October 2016.

As of March, 2017, the agreement that led to the renovations has come under dispute and a lawsuit has been filed. (Dark Side of the Moonlite: Lawsuit filed against owner of Moonlite Drive-in, BRISTOL HERALD COURIER Mar 24, 2017) 

Starting in 2020, Barter Theatre has been producing plays and staging them at the Moonlite Theatre due to the coronavirus pandemic.  Plays performed on a stage are simultaneously projected into the big screen.  Audio is provided through the radio and seating in cars allows for social distancing.  It is unknown how long this will last.

The future of the theater is unclear and the owner has it listed for sale with an asking price of $1.25 million.

See also

 List of drive-in theaters

Notes

References

Drive-in theaters in the United States
Theatres on the National Register of Historic Places in Virginia
Theatres completed in 1949
Buildings and structures in Washington County, Virginia
National Register of Historic Places in Washington County, Virginia
1949 establishments in Virginia
2013 disestablishments in Virginia